Dafydd Glyn Dyfrdwy was a 16th century Welsh bard. He is known to have written a number of cywydd style poems.

References 

Welsh male poets